The Third Round is the third Bulldog Drummond novel. It was published in 1924 and written by H. C. McNeile under the pen name Sapper.

Premise
Bulldog Drummond's old enemy Carl Peterson is hired by a diamond syndicate to suppress, by any means necessary, the eccentric Professor Goodman's newly discovered method for producing artificial diamonds. While accepting the syndicate's money, Peterson secretly plans to obtain the method for his own use. Drummond is drawn into the matter because his friend Algy Longworth happens to be engaged to the professor's daughter.

References

Bibliography

 

1924 British novels
British crime novels
English novels
Hodder & Stoughton books
British novels adapted into films